U was a streetcar line in Los Angeles, California. Also referred to as the University Line, it provided service to the University of Southern California.

History
The Los Angeles Consolidated Electric Railway University Line dates to November 12, 1891, when the Los Angeles Consolidated Electric Railway began operating on tracks run down McClintock Avenue. The route initially terminated at the Los Angeles Santa Fe station. The line came under the ownership of Los Angeles Railway Company in 1895 and was rerouted in Downtown, terminating at Spring and West 2nd Street. In 1910, the route was combined with trackage built by the Los Angeles and Redondo Railway Company along South Central Avenue, creating a "U" shaped route between Central Alameda and USC via Downtown. At the university end, tracks split to three branches: west on 39th to Western, east on 39th to the entrance to Agricultural Park (now Exposition Park), and south to Dalton Avenue and West 45th Street. The Agricultural Park segment was removed from the line in February 1915 and the Dalton segment was rerouted to terminate at Vernon Avenue and Arlington Avenue.

As part of the 1920 rerouting scheme, the line operated as the university and Central Avenue Line which had three branches. These services were designated as the "U" line in 1921. The remaining 39th Street branch line was abandoned on October 5, 1941, and the service was converted to bus operation on August 3, 1947. Segments of the line were absorbed into other routes, the 3 and F, while tracks on McClintock, 32nd, Hoover, Union, 23rd and Estrella were removed.

Sources

External lists
 U Line Archives — Pacific Electric Railway Historical Society
 

Los Angeles Railway routes
Railway services introduced in 1912
1912 establishments in California
1937 disestablishments in California
University of Southern California